Field of Dreams is a 1989 American sports fantasy drama film written and directed by Phil Alden Robinson, based on Canadian novelist W. P. Kinsella's 1982 novel Shoeless Joe. The film stars Kevin Costner as a farmer who builds a baseball field in his cornfield that attracts the ghosts of baseball legends, including Shoeless Joe Jackson (Ray Liotta) and the Chicago Black Sox. Amy Madigan, James Earl Jones, and Burt Lancaster (in his final film role) also star. It was theatrically released on May 5, 1989.

The film received generally positive reviews from critics, and was nominated for three Academy Awards: Best Picture, Best Original Score and Best Adapted Screenplay. In 2017, it was selected for preservation in the United States National Film Registry by the Library of Congress as "culturally, historically, or aesthetically significant".

Plot

Ray Kinsella lives with his wife, Annie, and daughter, Karin, on their Dyersville, Iowa, corn farm. Troubled by his broken relationship with his late father, John Kinsella, a devoted baseball fan, he fears growing old without achieving anything.

While walking through his cornfield one evening, he hears a voice whispering, "If you build it, he will come." He sees a vision of a baseball diamond in the cornfield and "Shoeless" Joe Jackson (who in real-life died in 1951) standing in the middle. Believing in him, Annie lets him plow under part of their corn crop to build a baseball field, at risk of financial hardship.

As Ray builds the field, he tells Karin about the 1919 Black Sox Scandal. Several months pass, and just as Ray is beginning to doubt himself, Shoeless Joe reappears, asking if others can play, and returns with the seven other Black Sox players. Annie's brother, Mark, can't see the players. He warns the couple they are going bankrupt and offers to buy their land. The voice, meanwhile, urges Ray to "ease his pain."

Ray and Annie attend a PTA meeting, where she argues against someone who is trying to ban books by Terence Mann, a controversial author and activist from the 1960s. Ray deduces the voice was referring to Mann, who had named one of his characters "John Kinsella" and had once professed a childhood dream of playing for the Brooklyn Dodgers. When Ray and Annie have identical dreams about Ray and Mann attending a game at Fenway Park, Ray finds Mann in Boston. Mann, who has become a disenchanted recluse, agrees to attend one game. There Ray hears the voice urging him to "go the distance", seeing statistics on the scoreboard for Archie "Moonlight" Graham, who played in one game for the New York Giants in 1922 but never got to bat. Mann also admits to hearing the voice and seeing the scoreboard.

They drive to Minnesota, learning that Graham, who was a physician, had died years earlier. Ray finds himself in 1972, encountering an elderly Graham, who says he happily left baseball for a satisfying medical career. During the drive back to Iowa, Ray picks up young hitchhiker Archie Graham, who is looking for a baseball team to join. Ray later tells Mann that his father dreamed of being a baseball player then tried to make him pick up the sport instead. At 14, after reading one of Mann's books, Ray stopped playing catch with his father, and they became estranged after he mocked John for having "a hero who was a criminal." Ray admits that his greatest regret is that his father died before they could reconcile. Arriving at the farm, they see various all-star players have arrived, fielding a second team. A game is played and Graham finally gets his turn at bat.

The next morning, Mark returns, demanding that Ray sell the farm or the bank will foreclose on him. Karin insists that people will pay to watch the ballgames. Mann agrees, saying that "people will come" to relive their childhood innocence. Ray and Mark scuffle, accidentally knocking Karin off the bleachers. despite knowing he will be unable to return after stepping off the saves her. Having become old Doc Graham again, he reassures Ray that he has no regrets. As he heads back toward the cornfield, he is commended by the other players, and before he can disappear into the corn, Shoeless Joe calls out, "Hey, rookie!" Graham stops and turns to Shoeless Joe, who deliberately tells him, "You were good." Doc Graham's eyes shine with tears before he smiles, turns back toward the corn, and disappears into it. Suddenly, Mark too can see the players and urges Ray to keep the farm.

Shoeless Joe invites Mann to enter the corn, and Mann disappears into it. Ray is angry at not being invited but Joe rebukes him, glancing towards the catcher at home plate, saying, "If you build it, he will come." When the catcher removes his mask, Ray recognizes him as his father as a young man. Ray realizes "ease his pain" referred to his own regrets.

Ray introduces John to his wife and daughter, initially without referring to him as his father. As John begins to head towards the cornfield, Ray, calling him "Dad", asks if he wants to have a catch. John gladly accepts as hundreds of cars are seen approaching the field, fulfilling the prophecy that people will come to watch baseball.

Cast

In addition, Anne Seymour, who died four months before the film's release, makes her final film appearance as the kindly Chisholm publisher who helps Ray and Mann. The identity of the actor who provided "The Voice", who speaks to Ray throughout the film, has remained unconfirmed since the film's release. Some believe it is Costner or Liotta, but the book's author W. P. Kinsella said he was told it was Ed Harris (Madigan's husband). Then-teenagers Matt Damon and Ben Affleck were extras in the Fenway Park scene.

Production
Phil Alden Robinson read Shoeless Joe in 1981 and liked it so much that he brought it to producers Lawrence and Charles Gordon. Lawrence Gordon worked for 20th Century Fox, part of the time as its president, and repeatedly mentioned that the book should be adapted into a film, but the studio always turned down the suggestion because they felt the project was too esoteric and noncommercial. Meanwhile, Robinson went ahead with his script, frequently consulting Kinsella for advice on the adaptation. Lawrence Gordon left Fox in 1986 and started pitching the adaptation to other studios. Universal Pictures accepted the project in 1987 and hired USC coach Rod Dedeaux as baseball advisor. Dedeaux brought along World Series champion and USC alumnus Don Buford to coach the actors.

The film was shot using the novel's title; eventually, an executive decision was made to rename it Field of Dreams. Robinson did not like the name, saying he loved Shoeless Joe, and that the new title was better suited for one about dreams deferred. Kinsella told Robinson after the fact that his original title for the book had been The Dream Field and that the publisher had imposed the title Shoeless Joe.

Casting
Robinson and the producers did not originally consider Kevin Costner for the part of Ray Kinsella because they did not think that he would want to follow Bull Durham with another baseball film. The role of Ray was first offered to Tom Hanks but he turned it down. He did, however, end up reading the script and became interested in the project, stating that he felt it would be "this generation's It's a Wonderful Life". Since Robinson's directing debut In the Mood had been a commercial failure, Costner also said that he would help him with the production. Amy Madigan, a fan of the book, joined the cast as Ray's wife, Annie. In the book, the writer Ray seeks out its real-life author J.D. Salinger. When Salinger threatened the production with a lawsuit if his name was used, Robinson decided to rewrite the character as reclusive Terence Mann. He wrote with James Earl Jones in mind because he thought it would be fun to see Ray trying to kidnap such a big man. Robinson had originally envisioned Shoeless Joe Jackson as being played by an actor in his 40s, someone who would be older than Costner and who could thereby act as a father surrogate. Ray Liotta did not fit that criterion, but Robinson thought he would be a better fit for the part because he had the "sense of danger" and ambiguity which Robinson wanted in the character. The role of Moonlight Graham was offered to James Stewart but he turned it down. Burt Lancaster had originally turned down the part of Moonlight Graham, but changed his mind after a friend, who was also a baseball fan, told him that he had to work on the film.

Filming
Filming began on May 25, 1988. The shooting schedule was built around Costner's availability because he would be leaving in August to film Revenge. Except for some weather delays and other time constraints, production rolled six days a week. The interior scenes were the first ones shot because the cornfield planted by the filmmakers was taking too long to grow. Irrigation had to be used to quickly grow the corn to Costner's height. Primary shot locations were in Dubuque County, Iowa; a farm near Dyersville was used for the Kinsella home; an empty warehouse in Dubuque was used to build various interior sets. Galena, Illinois, served as Moonlight Graham's Chisholm, Minnesota. One week was spent on location shots in Boston, most notably Fenway Park.

Robinson, despite having a sufficient budget as well as the cast and crew he wanted, constantly felt tense and depressed during filming. He felt that he was under too much pressure to create an outstanding film, and that he was not doing justice to the original novel. Lawrence Gordon convinced him that the end product would be effective.

During a lunch with the Iowa Chamber of Commerce, Robinson broached his idea of a final scene in which headlights could be seen for miles along the horizon. The Chamber folks replied that it could be done and the shooting of the final scene became a community event. The film crew was hidden on the farm to make sure the aerial shots did not reveal them. A production assistant drove from the set into town and measured the distance between, deducing it would require 1,500 cars to fill the shot. Dyersville was then blacked out and local extras drove their vehicles to the field. In order to give the illusion of movement, the drivers were instructed to continuously switch between their low and high beams.

Field

Scenes of the Kinsella farm were taken on the property of Don Lansing in Dyersville, Iowa; some of the baseball field scenes were shot on the neighboring farm of Al Ameskamp. Because the shooting schedule was too short for grass to naturally grow, the experts on sod laying responsible for Dodger Stadium and the Rose Bowl were hired to create the baseball field. Part of the process involved painting the turf green.

After shooting, Ameskamp again grew corn on his property; Lansing maintained his as a tourist destination. He did not charge for admission or parking, deriving revenue solely from the souvenir shop. By the film's twentieth anniversary, approximately 65,000 people visited annually. In July 2010, the farm containing the "Field" was listed as for sale. It was sold on October 31, 2011, to Go The Distance Baseball, LLC, for an undisclosed fee, believed to be around $5.4 million.

MLB at Field of Dreams

In 2019, Major League Baseball announced that it would hold a special neutral-site regular season game between the Chicago White Sox and New York Yankees at the Dyersville site on August 13, 2020, playing on an 8,000-seat field constructed adjacent to the original, with a pathway connecting the two. The field would be modeled upon the White Sox's former field, Comiskey Park (which was used from 1910 to 1990). As of July 1, 2020, the game was to still be played on August 13, 2020, but because of the shortened 2020 Major League Baseball season due to the COVID-19 pandemic, the White Sox would play the St. Louis Cardinals. On August 3, 2020, Major League Baseball announced that the game was cancelled due to logistical difficulties. It was later postponed to 2021.

The game was eventually held on the field on August 12, 2021, with the originally announced matchup of the White Sox and Yankees. In the pre-game show, Kevin Costner emerged from the cornfield onto the outfield, followed by the players and managers from both teams. At the old-fashioned microphone in the diamond, Costner said, "Is this heaven? Yes, it is." The White Sox beat the Yankees 9–8, following a walk-off home run in the bottom of the 9th inning by Tim Anderson, after the Yankees had scored four runs in the top of the inning to take an 8–7 lead.

A second Field of Dreams game was played during the 2022 season on August 11 with the Cincinnati Reds – who beat the White Sox in the 1919 World Series that was marred by the Black Sox Scandal – facing the Chicago Cubs, with the Cubs winning 4–2. This time, the movie was referenced in the pregame ceremonies by Ken Griffey Jr. asking his father Ken Griffey Sr. if he wanted to play catch. Both Griffeys – who played for the Reds and also played together for the Seattle Mariners – were joined first by fathers and sons (and daughters) also playing catch. The Cubs and Reds then also entered from the cornfield beyond centerfield along with multiple National Baseball Hall of Fame members representing both teams – catcher Johnny Bench and shortstop Barry Larkin for the Reds along with second baseman Ryne Sandberg, outfielder Andre Dawson, pitcher Ferguson Jenkins and left fielder Billy Williams for the Cubs. Jenkins also threw the ceremonial first pitch to Bench.

Music
Leonard Bernstein was the first choice to compose the score for the film but he was overbooked. At first, James Horner was unsure if he could work on the film due to scheduling restrictions until he watched a rough cut and was so moved that he accepted the job of scoring it. Robinson had created a temp track which was disliked by Universal executives. When the announcement of Horner as composer was made, the executives felt more positive because they expected a big orchestral score, similar to Horner's work for An American Tail. Horner, in contrast, liked the temporary score, finding it "quiet and kind of ghostly". He decided to follow the idea of the temp track, creating an atmospheric soundtrack which would "focus on the emotions". The score was nominated for the Academy Award for Best Original Score but lost to the Alan Menken score for The Little Mermaid. In addition to Horner's score, portions of several pop songs are heard during the film. They are listed in the following order in the closing credits:
 "Crazy", written by Willie Nelson and performed by Beverly D'Angelo
 "Daydream", written by John Sebastian and performed by the Lovin' Spoonful
 "Jessica", written by Dickey Betts and performed by the Allman Brothers Band
 "China Grove", written by Tom Johnston and performed by the Doobie Brothers
 "Lotus Blossom", written by Billy Strayhorn and performed by Duke Ellington

Historical connections
The character played by Burt Lancaster and Frank Whaley, Archibald "Moonlight" Graham, is based on an actual baseball player with the same name. His character is largely true to life except for a few factual liberties taken for artistic reasons. For instance, the real Graham's lone major league game occurred in June 1905, rather than on the final day of the 1922 season. The real Graham died in 1965, as opposed to 1972 as the film depicts. In the film, Terence Mann interviews a number of people about Graham. The DVD special points out that the facts they gave him were taken from articles written about the real man.

Release
Universal scheduled Field of Dreams to open in the U.S. on April 21, 1989. The film debuted in just a few theaters and was gradually released to more screens so that it would have a spot among the summer blockbusters. It ended up playing until December. The film was released in the Philippines by Eastern Films on November 1, 1989.

Reception
On Rotten Tomatoes the film has an approval rating of 88% based on 65 reviews, with an average rating of 8.00/10. The website's critics consensus reads: "Field of Dreams is sentimental, but in the best way; it's a mix of fairy tale, baseball, and family togetherness." On Metacritic the film has a weighted average score of 57 out of 100, based on 18 critics, indicating "mixed or average reviews". Audiences surveyed by CinemaScore gave the film an average grade of "A" on scale of A+ to F.

Roger Ebert awarded the film a perfect 4 stars, admiring its ambition: "This is the kind of movie Frank Capra might have directed, and James Stewart might have starred in—a movie about dreams." Caryn James of The New York Times wrote: "A work so smartly written, so beautifully filmed, so perfectly acted, that it does the almost impossible trick of turning sentimentality into true emotion." Duane Byrge of The Hollywood Reporter praised Costner for his performance, writing that it was his "eye-on-the-ball exuberance that carries Dreams past its often mechanical aesthetic paces."

Variety magazine gave the film a mixed review: "In spite of a script hobbled with cloying aphorisms and shameless sentimentality, Field of Dreams sustains a dreamy mood in which the idea of baseball is distilled to its purest essence." Peter Travers at Rolling Stone magazine panned the film and wrote: "To be honest, I started hearing things, too. Just when Jones was delivering an inexcusably sappy speech about baseball being "a symbol of all that was once good in America," I heard the words "If he keeps talking, I'm walking.""

Accolades
The film was nominated for three Academy Awards in 1990: Best Picture (Gordon & Gordon), Best Adapted Screenplay (Robinson), and Best Original Score (Horner). It did not win in any category.

American Film Institute Lists
 AFI's 100 Years...100 Movies—nominated
 AFI's 100 Years...100 Movie Quotes:
 "If you build it, he will come."—#39
 AFI's 100 Years of Film Scores—nominated
 AFI's 100 Years...100 Cheers—#28
 AFI's 100 Years...100 Movies (10th Anniversary Edition)—nominated
 AFI's 10 Top 10—#6 Fantasy Film

In 2017, the US Library of Congress selected Field of Dreams as one of its 25 annual additions to the National Film Registry. The announcement quotes film critic Leonard Maltin, who called the film "a story of redemption and faith, in the tradition of the best Hollywood fantasies with moments of pure magic."

In June 2008, after having polled over 1,500 people in the creative community, AFI revealed its "Ten Top Ten" — the best ten films in ten "classic" American film genres. The film was acknowledged as the sixth best one in the fantasy genre.

Home media
The film was released on VHS in 1989. It was later released on DVD on April 29, 1998. It was released on Blu-ray on March 13, 2011. It was released on 4K UHD Blu-Ray on May 14, 2019, for the film's 30th anniversary.

Possible television series
In August 2021, it was announced the film was being remade as a television series for Peacock. Michael Schur will write the series. In June 2022, it was revealed it was no longer moving forward at Peacock and Universal Television had begun shopping the project elsewhere.

See also

 Field of Dreams (Dubuque County, Iowa)
 MLB at Field of Dreams
 List of ghost films

References

External links

 
 
 
 
 

1989 films
1980s fantasy drama films
1980s ghost films
1980s sports drama films
American baseball films
American sports drama films
American fantasy drama films
American ghost films
Culture of Dubuque, Iowa
1980s English-language films
Films about families
Films about farmers
Films based on Canadian novels
Films based on works by W. P. Kinsella
Films directed by Phil Alden Robinson
Films produced by Lawrence Gordon
Films scored by James Horner
Films set in 1988
Films set in Boston
Films set on farms
Films set in Iowa
Films set in Minnesota
Films shot in Illinois
Films shot in Iowa
Films shot in Massachusetts
Magic realism films
Universal Pictures films
Carolco Pictures films
United States National Film Registry films
Cultural depictions of Shoeless Joe Jackson
1989 drama films
1980s American films
Films about Major League Baseball